was a Japanese actress. She is best known for her role as the first voice of Fune Isono from 1969 to 2015 in the longest-running Japanese anime series Sazae-san, which first aired in 1969. She was the voice of Dr. Pinako Rockbell in both Fullmetal Alchemist anime adaptations. Asō also starred as an actress in cinema, in the 2006 movie Aogeba Tōtoshi, directed by Jun Ichikawa. On September 18, 2015, it was announced that Asō would step down from her role in Sazae-san. She was replaced by Yorie Terauchi on October 5, 2015. On September 3, 2018, it was reported that Asō had died on August 25 from senility.

Filmography

Television animation 
 Gegege no Kitarō (1968)
 Akane-chan (1968)
 Sazae-san (1969), Fune Isono (first voice)
Andersen Stories (1971) Ferone's Nanny (eps 38–40)
 Wandering Sun (1971)
 Marvelous Melmo (1971), Melmo's aunt (first version) (eps 1, 21)
 Kashi no Ki Mokku (1972)
 Science Ninja Team Gatchaman (1972)
 Kerokko Demetan (1973)
 Fables of the Green Forest (1973), Narrator
 Wansa-kun (1973), Animal hospital director
 Alps no Shōjo Heidi (1974), Miss Rottenmeier
 Maya the Bee (1975), Cassandra-sensei
 Huckleberry no Bōken (1976)
Marco (1976)
 Piccolino no Bōken (1976), Giulietta the cat
 Candy Candy (1976), Mary Jane
 Attack on Tomorrow (1977), Kada sei
 Ippatsu Kanta-kun (1977), Kumiko Tabase
 Angie Girl (1977), Barbara
 The Story of Perrine (1978)
 Tōshō Daimos (1978), Margarete, Okane
 Galaxy Express 999 (1978), Boarding old lady (eps 60–61), Fimeru (ep 42)
 Anne of Green Gables (1979), Rachel Lynde
 Maegami-Taro (1979 special), Grandma
 Captain (1980 special), Takao's Mother
 Botchan (1980 special), Kiyoshi
 Hello! Sandybell (1981), Scott's wife
 Meiken Jolie (1981)
 Andromeda Stories (1982 special), Tarama (Jimsa's nurse)
 Captain (1983), Takao's Mother
 Manga Nihon-shi (1983), Nene
 Mori no Tonto-tachi (1984), Muori (Santa's wife)
 Harp Burma (1986 special), Old Woman
 Ranma ½ (1989), Cologne, Faith curer (ep 127), Theme Song Performance (eps 42–56)
 YuYu Hakusho (1992), Elder Ice Maiden
 Romeo and the Black Brothers (1995), Mimi Rossi
 Vampire Princess Miyu (1997), aquarium director (ep 15)
 Master Keaton (1998), Mrs. Burnham (ep 12)
 Inuyasha (2000), Shoga (ep 65)
 The Galaxy Railways (2003), Ine (ep 12)
 Fullmetal Alchemist (2003), Pinako Rockbell
 Maria Watches Over Us (2004), Academy Principal (ep 11)
 Maria Watches Over Us: Printemps (2004), Academy Principal (ep 2)
 El Cazador de la Bruja (2007), Salma (special guest; ep 1)
 Devil May Cry (2007), Margret (ep 8)
 Kure-nai (2008), Old woman (ep 3)
 Clannad After Story (2008), Shino Okazaki (ep 18)
 Fullmetal Alchemist: Brotherhood (2009), Pinako Rockbell

Original video animations 
 Yamataro Comes Back (1986), Woman
 Xanadu Dragonslayer Densetsu (1987), Sherin
 Little Twins (1992), Hara
 Ranma ½ (1993), Cologne
 The Final Flight of the Osiris (2003)
 Xam'd: Lost Memories (2008), Sannova
 Fairy Tail (2011), Hilda

Animated films 
 Galaxy Express 999 (1979), Tochiro's Mother
 Captain (1981), Takao's mother
 Doraemon: Nobita and the Haunts of Evil (1982), Maid
 Ranma ½: Big Trouble in Nekonron, China (1991), Cologne
 Doraemon: Nobita and the Legend of the Sun King (2000), Maid
 Fullmetal Alchemist the Movie: Conqueror of Shamballa (2005), Pinako Rockbell

Dubbing roles

Live-action
Colleen Dewhurst
The Dead Zone (1989 TV Asahi edition) (Henrietta Dodd)
Anne of Green Gables (Marilla Cuthbert)
Anne of Avonlea (Marilla Cuthbert)
Dying Young (Estelle Whittier)
Anne of Green Gables: The Continuing Story (Marilla Cuthbert)
Gemma Jones
Harry Potter and the Chamber of Secrets (Poppy Pomfrey)
Harry Potter and the Half-Blood Prince (Poppy Pomfrey)
Harry Potter and the Deathly Hallows – Part 2 (Poppy Pomfrey)
The Blues Brothers (1983 Fuji TV edition) (Sister Mary Stigmata (Kathleen Freeman))
Chocolat (Armande Voizin (Judi Dench))
Duel (Lady at Snakerama (Lucille Benson))
Dune (Reverend Mother Gaius Helen Mohiam (Siân Phillips))
Guess Who's Coming to Dinner (Mary Prentice (Beah Richards))
La Cage aux Folles II (Mrs. Baldi (Paola Borboni))
Lilies of the Field (1971 TV Asahi edition) (Mother Maria (Lilia Skala))
Music of the Heart (Assunta Guaspari (Cloris Leachman))
Sleeping with the Enemy (Chloe Williams (Elizabeth Lawrence))
Superman Returns (Martha Kent (Eva Marie Saint))
The Time Machine (1960) (Mrs. Watchett (Doris Lloyd))
The Time Machine (2002) (Mrs. Watchit (Phyllida Law))

Animation
 Robin Hood (1975), Mrs. Rabbit
 The Rescuers (1981), Ellie Mae
 An American Tail (1986), Mama Mousekewitz
 An American Tail: Fievel Goes West (1991), Mama Mousekewitz
 Fievel's American Tails (1992), Fievel; Mama Mousekewitz
 Sleeping Beauty (1995), Flora
 Home on the Range (2004), Pearl Gesner

Others 
 Japanese Style Originator (2008–18), Narrator

References

External links 
 『サザエさん』フネ役の麻生美代子が急病のため急遽代役で放送 News article about Miyoko Asō on Oricon 

 Oricon profile 
 
 

1926 births
2018 deaths
Japanese stage actresses
Japanese video game actresses
Japanese voice actresses
Tokyo Actor's Consumer's Cooperative Society voice actors
Voice actresses from Tokyo
20th-century Japanese actresses
21st-century Japanese actresses